4C-B (also known as 4C-DOB or DOB-B) is a lesser-known psychedelic drug which is related to 2C-B and DOB. It is a reasonably potent 5-HT2A receptor partial agonist with a Ki of 7.6nM, but has relatively low efficacy (15% relative to 5-HT). It is briefly mentioned in Alexander Shulgin's book PiHKAL (Phenethylamines i Have Known And Loved) but was never tested by him, however it has subsequently been tested by other researchers and was found to be active in a dose range of 50-80mg with a duration of around 8 hours, though with generally milder effects than 2C-B or DOB.

See also 
 4C-T-2
 Ariadne (psychedelic)
 Phenethylamine
 Psychedelics, dissociatives and deliriants
 ZC-B

References

Substituted amphetamines
2,5-Dimethoxyphenethylamines